Å (historically Aa) is a letter used in several Scandinavian, High German, and Finno-Permic languages.

Å may also refer to:

Places
Å ( or ) means stream or river in Scandinavian languages. A number of places have been named Å:

Norway
Å, Andøy, a village in Andøy municipality, Nordland county (Vesterålen)
Å, Ibestad, a village in Ibestad municipality, Troms county
Å, Lavangen, a village in Lavangen municipality, Troms county
Å, Meldal, a village in Meldal municipality, Trøndelag county
Å, Moskenes, a village in Moskenes municipality, Nordland county (Lofoten)
Å, Tranøy, a village in Tranøy municipality, Troms county
Å, Åfjord, a village in Åfjord municipality, Trøndelag county
Åfjord, a municipality in Trøndelag county (called Å from 1896 to 1963)

Sweden
Å, Sweden, a village in Norrköping municipality, Östergötland county
Å, a village in Örnsköldsvik municipality, Västernorrland county
Å, a village in Kramfors municipality, Västernorrland county
Å, a village in Söderhamn municipality, Gävleborg county
Å, a village in Uddevalla municipality, Västra Götaland county

Other
Ångström, a unit of length (abbreviation Å)

See also
A (disambiguation)
AA (disambiguation)
List of short place names